The Bouteroue Creek is a tributary of Lake Nicabau, flowing into the unorganized territory of Lac-Ashuapmushuan, Quebec into the Regional County Municipality (RCM) of Le Domaine-du-Roy, in the Saguenay-Lac-Saint-Jean administrative region, in Quebec, in Canada.

Bouteroue Creek flows entirely in the canton of Bouteroue. Forestry is the main economic activity of this valley; recreational tourism activities, second.

The route 167 between Chibougamau and Saint-Félicien, Quebec passes on the east side of Nicabau Lake. The Canadian National Railway runs along this road.

The surface of Bouteroue Creek is usually frozen from early November to mid-May, however, safe ice movement is generally from mid-November to mid-April.

Geography

Toponymy 
The toponym "ruisseau Bouteroue" was formalized on March 28, 1972, at the Commission de toponymie du Québec.

Notes and references

See also 

Rivers of Saguenay–Lac-Saint-Jean
Le Domaine-du-Roy Regional County Municipality